Unionville is a city in Putnam County, Missouri, United States. The population was 1,735 at the 2020 census. It is the county seat of Putnam County.

History
Unionville was first named Harmony when established in 1853 as the county seat for Putnam County. Prior to that the county seat had moved several times, often with heated debate, thus the centralized location hoping to bring "harmony" to all concerned. (see Putnam County history for more details)

The Union Township trustees first met on February 4, 1873, at the court-house in Unionville. Since that day, Unionville straddles the municipal border between Union Township and Wilson Township.

On May 22, 1962, Continental Airlines Flight 11, en route from O'Hare Airport in Chicago, Illinois to the downtown Kansas City, Missouri airport, crashed in a clover field north of Unionville, near Lake Thunderhead, killing all 37 passengers and 8 crew. Investigators subsequently determined that one of the jetliner's passengers, Thomas G. Doty, detonated a bomb inside the Boeing 707 in a suicide-for-insurance plot.

Geography and climate
Unionville is located in central Putnam County at the intersection of US Route 136 and Missouri Route 5. Lake Thunderhead on North Blackbird Creek lies to the northwest of the city and the Missouri-Iowa border is seven miles north.

Demographics

2010 census
As of the census of 2010, there were 1,865 people, 844 households, and 468 families living in the city. The racial makeup of the city was 97.1% White, 0.4% African American, 0.2% Native American, 0.7% Asian, 0.3% from other races, and 1.3% from two or more races. Hispanic or Latino of any race were 1.2% of the population.

There were 844 households, of which 28.6% had children under the age of 18 living with them, 39.2% were married couples living together, 12.2% had a female householder with no husband present, 4.0% had a male householder with no wife present, and 44.5% were non-families. 40.4% of all households were made up of individuals, and 21% had someone living alone who was 65 years of age or older. The average household size was 2.14 and the average family size was 2.86.

The median age in the city was 41.8 years. 24.2% of residents were under the age of 18; 7.4% were between the ages of 18 and 24; 21.9% were from 25 to 44; 23.9% were from 45 to 64; and 22.6% were 65 years of age or older. The gender makeup of the city was 46.5% male and 53.5% female.

2000 census
As of the census of 2000, there were 2,041 people, 913 households, and 530 families living in the city. The population density was 1,025.0 people per square mile (396.0/km). There were 1,048 housing units at an average density of 526.3 per square mile (203.3/km). The racial makeup of the city was 99.17% White, 0.05% African American, 0.10% Asian, 0.15% from other races, and 0.54% from two or more races. Hispanic or Latino of any race were 1.03% of the population.

There were 913 households, out of which 26.8% had children under the age of 18 living with them, 43.6% were married couples living together, 10.3% had a female householder with no husband present, and 41.9% were non-families. 38.6% of all households were made up of individuals, and 22.6% had someone living alone who was 65 years of age or older. The average household size was 2.17 and the average family size was 2.89.

In the city the population was spread out, with 24.2% under the age of 18, 8.1% from 18 to 24, 22.5% from 25 to 44, 19.8% from 45 to 64, and 25.4% who were 65 years of age or older. The median age was 40 years. For every 100 females, there were 85.2 males. For every 100 females age 18 and over, there were 77.9 males.

The median income for a household in the city was $19,978, and the median income for a family was $28,796. Males had a median income of $22,402 versus $16,741 for females. The per capita income for the city was $11,881. About 18.7% of families and 18.6% of the population were below the poverty line, including 21.3% of those under age 18 and 13.8% of those age 65 or over.

Education
Public education in Unionville is administered by Putnam County R-I School District. Unionville has a lending library, the Putnam County Public Library.

Notable people
 Bill Jackson - Children's TV host and cartoonist.
 Clare Magee - former U.S. Congressman
 John C. McKinley - former Missouri Lieutenant Governor.
 James K. Weatherford (1850-1935) - Oregon attorney and politician

References

External links
 Historic maps of Unionville in the Sanborn Maps of Missouri Collection at the University of Missouri

Cities in Putnam County, Missouri
County seats in Missouri
Cities in Missouri
Populated places established in 1853
1853 establishments in Missouri